Helmar Stiegler (born 18 March 1960) is an Austrian former professional tennis player.

A left-handed player from Vienna, Stiegler reached a best singles world ranking of 224 during his time on the professional tour. In 1980 he made the round of 16 at Grand Prix tournaments in Vienna and Sofia.

Stiegler is now an orthopedic surgeon.

ATP Challenger finals

Doubles: 3 (0–3)

References

External links
 
 

1960 births
Living people
Austrian male tennis players
Tennis players from Vienna